Lawrence Station is a settlement in New Brunswick.  Lawrence Station centres on the intersection of Route 3 and Route 127.

History

Notable people

See also
List of communities in New Brunswick

Communities in Charlotte County, New Brunswick